Philodendron balaoanum is a species of plant in the family Araceae. It is endemic to Ecuador.

References

balaoanum
Endemic flora of Ecuador
Critically endangered flora of South America
Taxonomy articles created by Polbot